Erik Tack (born 8 October 1958) is a Belgian politician for Vlaams Belang.

Life
Tack's occupation is general practitioner.

Since 2001 Tack is councillor of Ronse.

He also was a member of the Flemish parliament from 2004 till 2014.

References

Vlaams Belang politicians
1958 births
Living people
21st-century Belgian politicians